The 1908 United States presidential election in Minnesota took place on November 3, 1908 as part of the 1908 United States presidential election. Minnesota voters chose 11 electors to the Electoral College, which selected the president and vice president.

Minnesota was won by the Republican candidate, United States Secretary of War William Howard Taft over former Nebraska Congressman and two-time prior Democratic nominee William Jennings Bryan by a landslide margin of 26.09%. Taft went on to defeat Bryan nationally, with 321 electoral votes to the Democratic nominee's 162.

Results

Results by county

Close counties 
Carried by less than 5% of the county-wide vote:
 Brown, 0.54% 
 Winona, 0.93% 
 McLeod, 2.28% 
 Le Sueur, 3.16%

Statistics 
Counties with Highest Percent of Vote (Republican):
 Chisago, 79.90% 
 Cook, 77.98% 
 Pope, 76.86% 
 Goodhue, 74.90% 
 Watonwan, 70.44% 

Counties with Highest Percent of Vote (Democratic):
 Scott, 58.20% 
 Stearns, 56.86% 
 Winona, 49.16% 
 McLeod, 47.11% 
 Brown, 45.76% 

Counties with Highest Percent of Vote (Public Ownership):
 Lake, 31.75% 
 Roseau, 20.42% 
 Mahnomen, 16.40% 
 Clearwater, 15.69% 
 Crow Wing, 14.49%

See also
 United States presidential elections in Minnesota

Notes

References

Minnesota
1908
1908 Minnesota elections